The Edison Storage Battery Company was organized in New Jersey on May 27, 1901.
Edison Storage Battery Division label. The Edison Storage Battery was filed for patent in November 1900 and launched publicly on May 21, 1901.

Building
Edison Storage Battery Company Building, is located at 177 Main Street and Lakeside Avenue in West Orange, New Jersey. The building was added to the National Register of Historic Places on February 28, 1996.

References

Battery manufacturers
Thomas Edison
Electronics companies established in 1901
Defunct companies based in New Jersey